John Anthony Forrest (born 9 October 1947 in Tottington, Lancashire, England) is an English former professional footballer.

Career

Playing
Forrest spent the majority of his career with Bury, where he played from 1966 to 1980. He also spent the 1973 season Atlanta Apollos in the NASL where he made 17 appearances.

Coaching
Forrest worked as a coach for Bury and was appointed chief scout of Rochdale in September 2007.

Notes

1947 births
Living people
People from Tottington, Greater Manchester
English footballers
English expatriate footballers
Association football goalkeepers
Bury F.C. players
Atlanta Chiefs players
Expatriate soccer players in the United States
English Football League players
North American Soccer League (1968–1984) players
English expatriate sportspeople in the United States